Andrew Balfour (1873–1931) was a Scottish medical administrator and sportsman who played rugby union for Cambridge University.

Andrew Balfour may also refer to:

Andrew Balfour of Montquhanie, Scottish landowner
Andrew Balfour (botanist) (1630–1694), Scottish doctor and botanist
Andrew Balfour (architect) (1863–1943), Scottish architect
 Andrew Balfour (1741–1814), 16th of Whitehill, son of Robert Balfour, 4th of Balbirnie

See also
 David Andrew Balfour (1906–1985), 4th Baron Kinross